Henry Asa Coffeen (February 14, 1841 – December 9, 1912) was an American politician who served as Wyoming's United States Representative as a Democrat.

Life

Henry Asa Coffeen was born on February 14, 1841, in Gallipolis, Ohio to Alvah P. Coffeen and Olive Elizabeth Martin and his family later moved to Indiana and then to Homer, Illinois in 1853. He attended the country schools and was graduated from the scientific department of Abingdon College. He engaged in teaching and was a member of the faculty of Hiram College in Ohio. He moved to Sheridan in the Wyoming Territory in 1884; he was a delegate from Wyoming to the World's Fair Congress of Bankers and Financiers at Chicago in June 1893. In 1889 he was selected as one of the Democratic delegates to the Wyoming constitutional convention to draft its constitution to be submitted for statehood.

In 1885 he organized the first agricultural fair in Wyoming. In 1892 Coffeen narrowly defeated Clarence D. Clark and was elected to the United States House, but was defeated in a landslide by Frank Wheeler Mondell in 1894.

His first wife, Harriet King, died on June 4, 1901, and he remarried to Alice Dwight on June 28, 1904. On December 9, 1912, he died in Sheridan, Wyoming.

Electoral history

References

External links

 

1841 births
1912 deaths
19th-century American politicians
Democratic Party members of the United States House of Representatives from Wyoming
Hiram College faculty
People from Gallipolis, Ohio
People from Homer, Illinois